Bermuda has issued commemorative coins at various times. Most of these coins have been for the purpose of collecting, although Bermuda has also issued commemorative coins for regular circulation. All coins here were minted by the Royal Mint unless otherwise noted.

Pre-Decimalization

Decimalized

1970's

1980's

1990's

2000's

See also

Bermuda Monetary Authority

References

Bermuda
Economy of Bermuda